The following lists events that happened in 2004 in Libya.

Incumbents
President: Muammar al-Gaddafi
Prime Minister: Shukri Ghanem

Events

January
 January 6 - Pakistan is cited as the source of nuclear weapon technology supplied to Libya, Iran and North Korea. The components intercepted at sea by Italy en route to Libya were fabricated in Malaysia. There is no evidence that the Pakistani government of President Pervez Musharraf knew about the transfer of technology of Libya.

February
 February 25 - Libya's Foreign Minister, Abdulrahman Shalgam, issues a statement reaffirming its acceptance of culpability for the 1988 bombing of Pan Am Flight 103 over Lockerbie, after the Prime Minister Shukri Ghanem, in an interview for the BBC, claimed Libya had "bought peace" with the $2.7bn compensation payments, but had not accepted guilt.

March
 March 7 - The White House reports that all of Libya's remaining nuclear weapons-related equipment has been sent to the United States.

References

 
Years of the 21st century in Libya
Libya
Libya
2000s in Libya